The Embassy of the United States, Taipei is a former United States diplomatic mission in Zhongshan District, Taipei, Taiwan. The building current houses the Taipei Film House as a movie theater.

History

Empire of Japan
At the end of the 19th century, flourishing commerce in tea and camphor led many Western foreign countries such as the United States, the Netherlands, and Britain to establish consulates and trade offices in the Dadaocheng district of Taihoku Prefecture. The United States built its consulate at this location during the Japanese rule in 1926 as the American Consulate in Taihoku. Following World War II, it served as the US Ambassador's residence. Ambassadors Karl L. Rankin, Everett F. Drumright, Alan G. Kirk, Jerauld Wright, Walter P. McConaughy and Leonard S. Unger all made this building their home. It now stands as an historic witness to relations between Taipei and Washington, D.C.

In 1913, seeing that Taiwan's strategic position was gradually becoming more important, the U.S. government upgraded their offices in Taiwan.

In 1941, World War II broke out between Japan and the United States in the Pacific, forcing the American consulate in Taipei to close.

Republic of China
After the Japanese surrender ceremonies were conducted by the Republic of China on 25 October 1945, the United States established its consulate at the building on 4 April 1946. In 1948, it was upgraded to a consulate-general as the Consulate of the United States, Taipei and handled American business in Taiwan at the present address in Taipei's Zhongshan District. The first appointee to be stationed as consul general at the consulate was Robert C. Strong.

In 1950, the Korean War broke out, the United States again started aiding the Republic of China. In addition, ambassador was accredited to the Republic of China. In 1953, it was upgraded to an embassy status four years after taking over Nanjing.

On 1 January 1979, the United States switched diplomatic relations from the Republic of China to the People's Republic of China and subsequently the American Institute in Taiwan was established on 16 January 1979 to maintain non-diplomatic relations with Taiwan. The US embassy in Taipei was closed on 28 February 1979 and the building was left abandoned.

In 1957, there were protests at the embassy after a killing and alleged murder of a Republic of China national.

On 20 February 1997, the building was listed as historic monument by the government of the Republic of China. In 2000, the Taipei City Government and Taiwan Semiconductor Manufacturing Company (TSMC) under the Cultural and Educational Foundation began renovating the building. The building now houses the Taipei Film House.

Architecture
The building is a two-story mansion with white exterior wall with Victorian and American colonial style. The main hallway faces north with jutting veranda on its east side. The interior layout is designed around the central staircase.

Transportation
The building is accessible within walking distance northeast of Zhongshan Station of Taipei Metro.

See also
 American Institute in Taiwan
 Taiwan–United States relations
 Cinema of Taiwan

References

External links

 

2002 establishments in Taiwan
Taiwan–United States relations
Defunct diplomatic missions of the United States
Buildings and structures in Taipei
Theatres completed in 1926
Cinemas in Taiwan